Alexander Sascha Ritter (7 June 1833 – 12 April 1896) was a German composer and violinist. He wrote two operas - Der faule Hans and Wem die Krone?, a few songs, a symphonic waltz and two symphonic fantasias. Ritter died in Munich.

Life and career
He was born in Narva, Estonia. He studied in Frankfurt am Main under Joachim Raff. In 1854 he married Wagner's niece Franziska (1829-1895). They had a daughter Hertha, who in 1902 became the wife of the Austrian composer Siegmund von Hausegger.

Ritter had a strong influence on Richard Strauss. He persuaded him to abandon the conservative style of his youth, and begin writing tone poems; he also introduced Strauss to the essays of Richard Wagner and the writings of Schopenhauer. He encouraged Strauss to write his first opera Guntram, but was deeply disappointed at the final version of the libretto, which Ritter took to be a rejection of Schopenhauerian-Christian ideals.

See also
 Wagner family tree

External links

Grande Musica - Alexander Ritter
Libretti of some of his songs
Information about Wem die Krone?

1833 births
1896 deaths
People from Narva
German violinists
German opera librettists
19th-century German composers
German male dramatists and playwrights
19th-century German dramatists and playwrights
19th-century violinists
German male violinists
19th-century German male writers
19th-century German male musicians